Goppili is a village and panchayat in Meliaputti mandal, Srikakulam district in the state of Andhra Pradesh in India. It is located on the border between Andhra Pradesh and Orissa. The population of this village is 2546, of which 1223 are male and 1323 are female, living in 625 households (2011 census). Residents typically speak Oriya and Telugu.

Geography
The village is located at 18°49'North, 84°21'East. The village is precisely a foot from the Orissa border and is surrounded by lush green hillocks. There are five ponds scattered across the village, whose water is used for daily needs.

Facilities
The facilities available in the village are:

Two Anganwadi centres
One syndicate bank
Two schools: ZPHS (Zilla Parishad High School) and Elementary School (Primary School)

One veterinary hospital
Three medical stores, one of them owned by Mr. CH.V. Gunasagar
There are 5 ponds in the village which are used for daily general purposes and needs, while drinking water is obtained from a well.
One water reservoir named Varahala Gedda
One drinking water overhead tank
Panchayat office of Goppili
One post office

Temples

Two Lord Shiva Temples
Two Maa Kali Temple
Five Ammavari Temples

Crops
Sugarcane, Paddy, Raagi, pulses and groundnuts are grown in Goppili. The village is famous for twenty cashew nut factories in and surrounding the village which directly employ 2000 people, including the people from neighbouring villages.

Employment
Almost half of the population of the village is dependent upon agriculture. 50% of the population is employed in agriculture and 35% in business. The rest work for the government or are private employees.

Sarpanch/Gram Panchayat Head list

1st: Late Shri Mallareddi Satyanarayana Dora. In Office (31.10.1956-14.6.1970)

2nd: Late Shri Mallareddi  Narayana Rao Dora. In Office (15.6.1970-3.6.1991)

3rd: Shri Mallareddi  Markandeya Dora. In Office (4.6.1991-9.3.1995)

4th: Shri Mallareddi  Balakrishnamma Dora. (s/o Late Shri Mallareddi  Narayana Rao Dora). In Office (10.3.1995-20.10.2001)

5th: K Rajarao. In Office (21.10.2001-13.8.2006)

6th: Mallareddi Padmavati Dora. (w/o Late Shri Mallareddi Narayana Rao Dora). In Office (14.8.2006-21.8.2011)

7th: Malathi Jayaram. In Office (22.8.2011-21.8.2016)

8th: Malathi Rushendramani. In Office (21.8.2016-Incumbent)

The 1st to 4th & 6th Sarpanch represent altogether 44 years of office under relatives of the Goppili Zamindars.

References

External links 
 Elites of South Asia:  Landed gentry in A.P by Hugh Gray :page 119 feudal landlords,Dora|Zamindhar.

Villages in Srikakulam district